Sociedad Deportiva Negreira is a Spanish football team based in Negreira, in the autonomous community of Galicia.Founded in 1964, it plays in Tercera División – Group 1, holding home matches at Estadio Xesús García Calvo, with a capacity of 2,000 seats.

Season to season

1 seasons in Segunda División B
13 seasons in Tercera División

Famous players
 Pibe
 David Casablanca

External links
Futbolme team profile 
Club blog 

Negreira
Negreira
1964 establishments in Spain